The Ministry of Foreign Affairs (literally Ministry of People's Power for Foreign Affairs) is one of the organizations that make up the executive cabinet of the Venezuelan government.

Among the main functions of this ministry is to promote, organize and plan policies abroad for Venezuela.

The ministry is a body directly dependent on the orders of the president of Venezuela. Its official headquarters are located in the Yellow House, in front of Bolívar Square. Its administrative headquarters on Avenida Urdaneta, Torre MRE (former headquarters of the defunct National Discount Bank).

Departments
Vice Ministry for Africa
Vice Ministry for Latin America
Vice Ministry for North America
Vice Ministry for Asia, the Middle East and Oceania
Vice Ministry for the Caribbean
Vice Ministry for Europe
Vice Ministry for Economy and International Cooperation
Vice Ministry for International Communication
Vice Ministry for Multilateral Affairs.

Ministers

See also
Foreign relations of Venezuela

References

Venezuela
Foreign
Foreign relations of Venezuela